is the seventh studio album by Japanese rock band GO!GO!7188. The limited release first press also included a DVD featuring PV's for the single "Futashika Tashika" and a live performance, "Omata Kara no Live Eizou."

Track listing

Notes and references

External links 
 GO!GO!7188 Official Website Discography (Japanese)

GO!GO!7188 albums
2009 albums